Ledrinae is a relatively small subfamily within the very large and diverse leafhopper family Cicadellidae.  Originally placed  in its own family, the "Ledridae", it is based on the type genus Ledra.

Description

The Ledrinae are mostly green or brown with a flattened body and tibiae. The ocelli are located near the crown and the forewings have a dense network of veins.

Tribes and Genera
The subfamily contains around 500 species which are divided into 5 to 7 tribes depending on the taxonomy followed. A 2009 revision treats the subfamily as having five tribes. The Afrorubrini are found only in southern Africa with 2 genera; the Hespenedrini has a single genus in Chile; Rubrini with a single genus in Australia; and two larger tribes that have a more widespread distribution, especially the Ledrini. Altogether there are more than 40 genera and around 14 others which are not well-placed.

Genera considered members of the subfamily Ledrinae are listed below; Biolib.cz currently lists seven tribes.

Afrorubrini 
An African tribe, created by Jones in 2009 and consist of two genera:
 Afrorubria Linnavuori, 1972 c g
 Sichaea Stål, 1866

Ledrini

The largest tribe (including Petalocephalini), in number of genera, was originally erected by Fairmaire in 1855 and includes the following genera:

 Bascarrhinus Fowler, 1898 c g
 Beniledra Linnavuori, 1972 c g
 Betsileonas Kirkaldy, 1903 c g
 Camptelasmus Spinola, 1850
 Chatura Distant, 1908
 Cololedra Evans, 1969
 Confucius Distant, 1907
 Destinia Nast, 1952
 Destinoides Cai & He, 2000
 Dusuna Distant, 1907
 Eleazara Distant, 1908
 Eogypona Kirkaldy, 1901
 Epiclinata Metcalf, 1952
 Ezrana Distant, 1908
 Funkikonia Katô, 1931
 Hangklipia Linnavuori, 1972
 Hemipeltis Spinola, 1850
 Jukaruka Distant, 1907
 Latycephala McKamey, 2006
 Ledra Fabricius, 1803
 Ledracorrhis Evans, 1959
 Ledromorpha Stål, 1864
 Ledropsella Evans, 1966
 Ledropsis White, 1844
 Macrotrichia Zhang, Sun & Dai, 2009
 Midoria Katô, 1931
 Neotituria Kato, 1932
 Pachyledra Schumacher, 1912
 Parapetalocephala Katô, 1931
 Petalocephala Stål, 1854
 Petalocephaloides Kato, 1931
 Platyjassites† Hamilton, 1990
 Platyledra Evans, 1936
 Porcorhinus Goding, 1903
 Stenoledra Evans, 1954
 Thlasia Germar, 1836
 Titiella Bergroth, 1920
 Tituria Stål, 1865
 Turitia Schumacher, 1912

Monotypic Tribes
 Hespenedra Kramer, 1966 (tribe Hespenedrini)
 Rubria Stål, 1865 c g (tribe Rubrini)

Stenocotini
 Anacotis Evans, 1937 c g
 Kyphocotis Kirkaldy, 1906 c g
 Kyphoctella Evans, 1966 c g
 Ledracotis Evans, 1937 c g
 Smicrocotis Kirkaldy, 1906 c g
 Stenocotis Stål, 1854 c g

Thymbrini
This tribe was erected by Evans in 1936; Biolib lists the following genera:

 Alseis Kirkaldy, 1907 c g
 Epipsychidion (insect) Kirkaldy, 1906
 Hackeriana Evans, 1937 c g
 Ledraprora Evans, 1937 c g
 Ledrella Evans, 1937 c g
 Macroceps Signoret, 1879 c g
 Microledrella Evans, 1969 c g
 Mitelloides Evans, 1939 c g
 Novothymbris Evans, 1941 c g
 Platyhynna Berg, 1884 c g
 Putoniessa Kirkaldy, 1907 c g
 Putoniessiella Evans, 1969 c g
 Rhotidoides Evans, 1937 c g
 Rhotidus Walker, 1862 c g
 Putoniessa Kirkaldy, 1907 c g
 Putoniessiella Evans, 1969 c g
 Rhotidoides Evans, 1937 c g
 Rhotidus Walker, 1862 c g
 Stenalsella Evans, 1966 c g
 Thymbrella Evans, 1969 c g
 Thymbris Kirkaldy, 1907 c g

Xerophloeini 

This tribe was erected by Oman in 1943; Biolib lists five genera:
 Pariacaca Szwedo, 2002 c g
 Piezauchenia Spinola, 1850 c g
 Proranus Spinola, 1850 c g
 Xedreota  c g
 Xerophloea Germar, 1839 c g b

Data sources: i = ITIS, c = Catalogue of Life, g = GBIF, b = Bugguide.net

Note: Platyhynna Berg, 1884 c g is now placed in the tribe Hyalojassini (in the family Cicadellidae).

Gallery

References

External links 
 Identification key

 
Cicadellidae